Kalandorok ("Adventurers") is a 2008 Hungarian film directed by Béla Paczolay. A retired teacher, his son and his grandson take a road trip to Budapest.

Cast
Péter Haumann as Grandpa
 as Géza
Milán Schruff as Andris
Ágnes Bánfalvy as Widow

External links

2008 films
2000s Hungarian-language films
2008 comedy films
Hungarian comedy films